Edward Singleton Holden (November 5, 1846 – March 16, 1914) was an American astronomer and the fifth president of the University of California.

Early years
He was born in St. Louis, Missouri, in 1846 to Edward and Sarah Frances (Singleton) Holden. From 1862–66, he attended Washington University in St. Louis, where he obtained a B.S. degree.  He later trained at West Point in the class of 1870.

Career
In 1873 he became professor of mathematics at the US Naval Observatory, where he made a favorable impression on Simon Newcomb. On August 28, 1877, a few days after Asaph Hall discovered the moons of Mars Deimos and Phobos,  he claimed to have found a third satellite of Mars. Further analysis showed large mistakes in his observations.
He was director of Washburn Observatory at the University of Wisconsin–Madison from 1881 to 1885.  He was elected a member of the American National Academy of Sciences in 1885. He discovered a total of 22 NGC objects during his work at Washburn Observatory.

Holden was president of the University of California from 1885 until 1888, and the first director of the Lick Observatory from 1888 until the end of 1897. He resigned as a result of internal dissent over his management among his subordinates. While at the Lick Observatory, he was the founder of the Astronomical Society of the Pacific and its first president (1889–1891). Holden was awarded five honorary degrees: an M.A. degree from Washington University in 1879,
an LL.D. from the University of Wisconsin in 1886, an LL.D. from Columbia University in 1887, a Sc.D. from the University of the Pacific in 1896 and a Litt.D. from Fordham College in 1910.

In 1901, Holden became the librarian of the United States Military Academy at West Point, where he remained until his death. He was buried at the West Point Cemetery on March 18, 1914.

Works
He wrote many books on popular science (and on other subjects, such as flags and heraldry), including science books intended for children, for example:

 On the Mughal Emperors.
 Real Things In Nature. A Reading Book of Science for American Boys and Girls, 1916.

Legacy
Holden was a founding member of the Cosmos Club.

The asteroid 872 Holda, the crater Holden on the Moon and the crater Holden on Mars are all named in his honor.

Family
His cousin George Phillips Bond was director of Harvard College Observatory. His grandson, also named Edward Singleton Holden, was a well known inventor with numerous patents to his name. He is credited with designing the rolled stainless steel gauge present in most modern fire extinguishers.

References

External links

 
 
 
 
University of California Presidents' biographies
 ASP: Centennial History of the Astronomical Society of the Pacific at www.astrosociety.org Bracher, Katherine: The Centennial History of the Astronomical Society of the Pacific (Mercury Magazine, Sept/Oct 1989)
 Osterbrock, Donald E., The Rise and Fall of Edward S. Holden – Part One, JOURN. HISTORY OF ASTRONOMY V.15:2, NO.43, P. 81, 1984
  Part Two – V.15, NO. 3/OCT, P.151, 1984
National Academy of Sciences Biographical Memoir
 Portraits of Edward S. Holden from the Lick Observatory Records Digital Archive, UC Santa Cruz Library's Digital Collections

Obituaries
 JRASC 8 (1914) 142
 MNRAS 75 (1914) 264
 Obs 37 (1914) 182 (one paragraph)
 PASP 26 (1914) 77–87

1846 births
1914 deaths
People from St. Louis
Washington University in St. Louis alumni
United States Military Academy alumni
United States Army officers
American astronomers
Washington University physicists
Washington University in St. Louis mathematicians
University of Wisconsin–Madison faculty
University of California regents
Members of the United States National Academy of Sciences
Leaders of the University of California, Berkeley
Lick Observatory
American librarians
People from West Point, New York
Burials at West Point Cemetery